Leo Smit (January 12, 1921 – December 12, 1999) was an American composer and pianist.

Life
Leo Smit was born in Philadelphia, Pennsylvania. As a child his mother took him to  the Soviet Union where he studied with the composer Dmitri Kabalevsky. He later studied piano in New York   with Isabella Vengerova and José Iturbi  and composition with Nicolas Nabokov.  While working as George Balanchine's rehearsal pianist, he met Igor Stravinsky.

He often gave thematic recitals – sometimes illustrated with his own slides – and performed a great deal of new music, especially works by  Aaron Copland. His breakthrough as a composer came in 1957, when the Boston Symphony Orchestra played his  First Symphony. In that year he moved to Los Angeles to teach at the University of California, Los Angeles. From 1962 he taught at the State University of New York at Buffalo. He wrote two operas: The Alchemy of Love (1969), in collaboration with the British astronomer Sir Fred Hoyle, with whom he also worked on an oratorio about Copernicus; and Magic Water (1978). Later in his life, he composed nearly 100 songs to texts by  Emily Dickinson.

He was also a  talented photographer, taking many pictures of notable musicians.
He died in Encinitas, California, at the age of 78, of congestive heart failure.

Awards
1950 Guggenheim Fellowship
1973 Rome Prize

References

External links
 Leo Smit Photograph Collection from the University at Buffalo Libraries
 Biographical essay by Neil W. Levin from the Milken Archive of Jewish Music
 Interview with Leo Smit, November 5, 1986
 , WNCN-FM, 25-Dec-1981

1921 births
1999 deaths
American male classical composers
American classical composers
American opera composers
Male opera composers
20th-century classical composers
Musicians from Philadelphia
20th-century American photographers
American people of Dutch descent
20th-century American composers
Classical musicians from Pennsylvania
20th-century American male musicians
American expatriates in the Soviet Union